Harunabad-e Sofla (also Romanized as Hārūnābād-e Soflá; also known as Hārūnābād, Hārūnābād-e Pā’īn, and Kharnabad) is a village in Ab Bar Rural District, in the Central District of Tarom County, Zanjan Province, Iran. At the 2006 census, its population was 554, in 123 families.

References 

Populated places in Tarom County